Claudio Valigi (born 3 February 1962 in Deruta) is an Italian association football manager,  who last served as head coach of Lupa Frascati and former player.

Career

Player

After spending the first three seasons of his career with Ternana Calcio in the second and then third tier of Italian football, before the 1982/83 season he received several offers from the Serie A teams, including A.C. Milan. He chose A.S. Roma. In that season he collected 13 appearances as the backup to Falcão, Herbert Prohaska and Carlo Ancelotti. He was called Falcão's heir due to certain similarities in playing style. However, after winning the championship that season, he was sold to Perugia Calcio and never played on the top level in Italy again, not fulfilling the lofty expectations.

Coach

In the season 2010-11 he was the manager of Sambonifacese in the Lega Pro Seconda Divisione.

On 4 October 2011 he became the new coach of Mantova in the Lega Pro Seconda Divisione, in place of the sacked Archimede Graziani. On 28 February 2012 he was sacked.

In summer 2012 he was named new coach of Lupa Frascati just promoted in Serie D, but on 17 December 2012 he was sacked.

Honours
 Serie A champion: 1982/83 with Roma.

References

1962 births
Living people
People from Deruta
Italian footballers
Serie A players
Ternana Calcio players
A.S. Roma players
A.C. Perugia Calcio players
Calcio Padova players
A.C.R. Messina players
Mantova 1911 players
Benevento Calcio players
Mantova 1911 managers
Association football midfielders
Italian football managers
Footballers from Umbria
Sportspeople from the Province of Perugia